The Eminent Jay Jay Johnson Volume 1 is the name used for two different but related albums by American jazz trombonist J. J. Johnson.

The 1989 CD release (CDP 7 81505 2, etc.) is a reissue of the 1953 10-inch Blue Note album  Jay Jay Johnson with Clifford Brown... (BLP 5028) with three alternate takes (bonus tracks) from the same recording session. The 1955 12-inch LP version is a compilation of (most of) the ...with Clifford Brown album combined with (most of) the material from the 1954 10-inch LP release, The Eminent Jay Jay Johnson, Vol. 2 (BLP 5057).

At the time of the 1953 recording session, Johnson had withdrawn from full-time playing to work as a blueprint inspector.

Reception

The Allmusic review by Scott Yanow awarded the album 4½ stars and stated "Although Johnson has a couple of features, Clifford Brown largely steals the show". The Penguin Guide to Jazz included both volumes of The Eminent Jay Jay Johnson in its "Core Collection", and assigned its "crown" accolade, along with a four-star rating (of a possible four stars), to both albums. Penguin editors Richard Cook and Brian Morton called the first volume "one of the central documents of post-war jazz."

Release history
Part of the album's content was originally released as part of Blue Note's 10-inch Modern Jazz 5000 Series, as BLP 5028, entitled Jay Jay Johnson with Clifford Brown. When reissued in Blue Note's 12-inch 1500 series of LPs, tracks from the original 1953 recording session were spread over two albums and combined with tracks from a later session (which had been released as The Eminent Jay Jay Johnson, Vol. 2 (BLP 5057)), producing The Eminent Jay Jay Johnson, Volume 1 (BLP 1505) and The Eminent Jay Jay Johnson, Volume 2 (BLP 1506). The CD reissue put the original six tracks from BLP 5028 together with three alternative takes from the same session and had the title The Eminent Jay Jay Johnson, Volume 1, although variations in punctuation do occur. Although it uses the same artwork as BLP 1505 it is essentially an expanded reissue of the original "Jay Jay Johnson With..." 10 inch album (BLP 5028) rather than a reissue of "The Eminent...Volume 1" (BLP 1505) compilation itself.

Track listing

The 1989/1997 Blue Note CD re-issues (CDP 7 81505 2) include the same content as the 2001 CD, but the tracks are arranged chronologically by recording date.

Personnel
June 22, 1953, recording session.  LP tracks 1–5 and all CD tracks:
J.J. Johnson – trombone
Clifford Brown – trumpet (except "It Could Happen To You")
Jimmy Heath – tenor saxophone, baritone saxophone (except "It Could Happen To You")
John Lewis – piano
Percy Heath – bass
Kenny Clarke – drums
September 24, 1954, recording session.  LP tracks 6–10:
J.J. Johnson – trombone
Wynton Kelly – piano
Charles Mingus – bass
Kenny Clarke – drums
Sabu Martinez – congas (except, "It's You or No One")

References

Blue Note Records albums
J. J. Johnson albums
1955 albums